Denis Barré (born February 4, 1948 in Lachine) is a Canadian sprint canoer who competed in the 1970s. Competing in two Summer Olympics, he earned his best finish of eighth in the K-2 1000 m event at Montreal in 1976.

Barré's wife, Alexandra, won two canoeing medals at the 1984 Summer Olympics in Los Angeles with a silver in the K-2 500 m and a bronze in the K-4 500 m event. Their daughter, Mylanie, has competed in two Summer Olympics of her own, earning her best finish of seventh in the K-2 500 m event at Athens in 2004.

References
 

1948 births
Canadian male canoeists
Canoeists at the 1972 Summer Olympics
Canoeists at the 1976 Summer Olympics
Living people
Olympic canoeists of Canada
People from Lachine, Quebec
Canoeists from Montreal